DNTV2 was a television station in Dunedin, New Zealand established by the then New Zealand Broadcasting Corporation in 1962.  Its base, and studio complex operated from the historic Garrison Hall in Dowling Street.  Until 2010 Garrison Hall was occupied by NHNZ which has since moved to a larger facility in Melville Street.  Garrison Hall remains a television production hub to this day, it is now home to Animation Research, Taylormade Media, The Video Factory and Kahawai Productions.

History
Broadcasting to Dunedin began on 31 July 1962.  This followed successful start ups in Auckland, Wellington and Christchurch.  Initially there was no networking between the four stations, imported programmes and news footage needed to be physically sent between the different centres meaning differing transmission dates. The first network news was read by Dougal Stevenson on 5 November 1969.

Initially, DNTV2 was broadcast from a transmitter at Highcliff. Coverage was extended to South Otago and Southland in 1964 with the commissioning of relay stations at Kuriwao and Mount Hedgehope. The Mount Cargill transmitter was commissioned in 1970 to replace the Highcliff transmitter.

Following expansion in the 1960s, news, administration and production staff moved to other locations nearby including Orbell Chambers and the Methodist Central Mission, both in Stuart Street.  The set construction unit moved to Fryatt Street in the city's wharf area.  This left the Garrison Hall facility as studios, transmission control, wardrobe, make-up and dressing rooms.

On 1 April 1975, DNTV2 was folded, along with Wellington-based WNTV1 into Television One.  The newly created network would have two production facilities, those being Garrison Hall and the newly opened Avalon Television Centre.  Although the Avalon facility was larger and purpose built, at times the production output from the Dunedin operation exceeded that of Avalon.

In 1980 Television One was combined with Television Two to create a combined Television New Zealand.  The Dunedin operation becoming one of four TVNZ production sites along with Wellington, Auckland and Christchurch.  Although it was the smallest of the production centres, its share of output to the national networks stood at around 30% before TVNZ began cutbacks in the late 1980s and early 1990s.  In effort to stave off competition from the soon to launch TV3, TVNZ production was scaled back nationwide and centralised in a new facility in Auckland.

While TVNZ was scaling back production, one exception was the Natural History Unit, which continued to thrive and was eventually sold off by TVNZ as a going concern as NHNZ.  Other offshoot production companies were born out of TVNZ's retreat from Dunedin.  Notable companies being Animation Research, Taylormade Productions, and Kids TV.

See also

 TVNZ
 Television One
 NHNZ
 Television in New Zealand

References

External links
 Animation Research Limited
 Taylormade Media Limited
 NHNZ
 Television New Zealand

Television stations in New Zealand
History of Dunedin
Mass media in Dunedin
Television channels and stations established in 1962